Maple Hill Open is an annual disc golf tournament held at the Maple Hill Disc Golf Course in Leicester, Massachusetts.

For six years, the event (formerly known as The Vibram Open), had the largest MPO and FPO payout of any stop on the PDGA National Tour. In its formative years, the event was known as the MSDGC and established itself as one of the touring pros' favorite stops on the pro tour. The course is highly rated as a top 10 course in the world.

The event has been covered by ESPN, NPR, photographed, Chronicle, numerous regional outlets (Worcester Telegram, Blackstone Valley Press, WTAG, WAAF), and basically every disc golf media source (PDGA, Ultiworld Disc Golf, Smashboxx.TV, Disc Golf Planet, Disc Golf Monthly, Disc Golf Live, thediscgolfguy) and blog.

The Maple Hill Open / Vibram Open / MSDGC has been an innovative disc golf event and has helped pioneer:

 Annual DVD reviews of disc golf tournaments
 Live scoring
 Live video broadcasts
 Live audio commentary
 The Spirit Award in disc golf

References 

 Maple Hill Open
 Vibram Open
 Professional Disc Golf Association articles about the Vibram Open
 ESPN's "Disc golf has a tour" article about Vibram Open
 NPR's Karen Givens of Only A Game on the Vibram Open
 Worcester Telegram 2013 Vibram Open article
 Worcester Telegram 2013 Vibram Open, Notable things to do article
 Disc Golf Guy interviews Cale Leiviksa/Catrina Allen, 2012 Vibram Open champions
 Disc Golf Guy highlights and interviews from the 2012 Vibram Open
 Disc Golf Planet TV interviews Nate Doss, 2011 Vibram Open leader
 3X Emmy Award winner Derek Hastings intro reel to the 2010 Vibram Open
 Worcester Telegram 2010 Vibram Open article
 Disc Golf Live segment on the 2010 Vibram Open
 Worcester Telegram 2009 Vibram Open article
 Disc Golf Monthly highlights the 2009 Vibram Open
 GoLocalWorcester Course Reviews mention of Vibram Open

Leicester, Massachusetts
Disc golf tournaments